An oil skimmer is a device that is designed to remove oil floating on a liquid surface from oil spills. The effectiveness of a skimmer is highly dependent on the roughness of the surrounding water that it is working on: the more choppy the surrounding wake and water, the more water the oil skimmer will take in along with the oil, rather than take in oil alone. Skimmers can be self-propelled, used from shore, or operated from vessels, with the best choice being dependent on the specifics for the job at hand. Skimmers can be pressed into use for a number of applications other than oil spills, with the correct type to use again being dependent on the nature of the intended application. Examples of possible uses include making skimmers one component of oily water treatment systems, removing oil from machine tool coolant and aqueous parts washers, and collecting fats, oils, and greases as part of wastewater treatment efforts for food manufacturing industries.

Oil skimmers are different from swimming pool sanitation skimmers, which are designed for a similar but unrelated purpose.

Oil skimmers were used to great effect to assist in the remediation of the Exxon Valdez spill in 1989.

Limitation and design factors
There are many different types of oil skimmer. Each type has different design features and therefore results in different applications and use. It is important to understand the design features before employing a particular skimmer type.

Some factors to consider are:
 Oil removal flow rate: Alternative Skimmer designs have different oil removal flow rates. Volume removal rates for Oleophilic skimmer types (drum, brush, disc, belt) are comparatively low. Weir type skimmers are capable of very high oil and water removal rates. ASTM F2709 standard establishes the test procedure for determining oil recovery rate (ORR).
 Oil removal concentration: It is a common misconception that oil skimmers remove concentrated or pure 'oil'; when in fact they remove a mixture of oil and water. In most situations the 'oil' mixture removed is an emulsion of oil and water more like a 'mousse'. Oleophilic and Non-Oleophilic skimmers can provide a more concentrated oil in the removal stream, however still collect entrained water.
 Effectiveness with different oils: Oleophilic and Non-Oleophilic skimmers are not equally effective with all oil types due to the changing nature of the attraction forces with different oils and materials.
 Effectiveness with chemicals in the water: Oleophilic skimmers may not work as effectively if there are detergents, cleaners or other surfactants in the water that interfere with the oleophilic attraction. Weir skimmers are not affected by chemicals.
 Effects of trash and debris: Trash and debris may block or interfere with the operation of oil skimmers.
 Skimming direction: Some skimmers only remove oil from one direction. In some situations, such as skimming from pits and tanks, it can be important to remove oil from all directions.
 Service Access: Some skimmers such as disc skimmers, or weir skimmers with skimmer mounted pumps, contain heavy serviceable items of equipment mounted on the skimmer. This may require special lifting equipment and confined space entry safety considerations before servicing.

Applications
The use of skimmers in industrial applications is often required to remove oils, grease and fats prior to further treatment for environmental discharge compliance. By removing the top layer of oils, water stagnation, smell and unsightly surface scum can be reduced. Placed before an oily water treatment system an oil skimmer may give greater overall oil separation efficiency for improved discharge wastewater quality. All oil skimmers will pick up a percentage of water with the oil which will need to be decanted to obtain concentrated oil.

Types
There are two main types of oil skimmer: oleophilic and non-oleophilic. Oleophilic skimmers include disc, belt, tube, brush, mop, brush, grooved disc, smooth drum, and grooved drum. Non-oleophilic skimmers include weir (manual or self-adjusting).

Oleophilic
Oleophilic skimmers function by using an element such as a drum, disc, belt, rope or mop to which the oil adheres. The oil is wiped from the oleophilic surface and collected in a tank. As the oil is adhering to a collection surface the amount of water collected when oil is not present will be limited.

Belt
Belt oil skimmers are one of the most reliable and economical equipment for removing liquid surface floating oil with low electric consumption without the need for any consumable. They can effective remove all kinds of floating oil (including machine oil, kerosene, diesel oil, lubricating oil, plant oil and other liquids with specific gravity less than water. This is a versatile skimmer design, it can remove floating oil no matter what the thickness of the oil layer is.

Drum

Drum skimmers operate by using one or more drums made from oleophilic material. As the drums rotate oil adheres to the surface, separating it from the water. Wiper blades remove the oil from the drums depositing it into the collection trough where it is pumped to a storage location. Drum skimmers are lightweight and have a high oil recovery rate. The drums can be either smooth or grooved. These types of skimmers are generally used in oil spill response and various industrial operations.

Disc
Disc skimmers are oleophilic skimmers that use a disc constructed from PVC, steel or aluminum and can be either smooth or grooved. They are capable of recovering high volumes of oil with very little water. They can be equipped with either a single or multiple discs. The discs can be driven by hydraulic, electric, diesel or air motors. DISCOIL technology patented by OCS in the year 1970, is able to recover all the hydrocarbons on the surface of water: 98% of oil with the only 2% of water. It is hydraulic type and able to operate also in classified areas, as ATEX Zone 0, 1 and 2.

Non-oleophilic

Non-oleophilic skimmers are distinguished by the component used to collect the oil. A metal disc, belt or drum is used in applications where an oleophilic material is inappropriate, such as in a hot alkaline aqueous parts washer. The skimmer is generally turned off whenever there is no oil to skim thus minimizing the amount of water collected.  Metal skimming elements are nearly as efficient as oleophilic skimmers when oil is present.

Weir
Weir skimmers function by allowing the oil floating on the surface of the water to flow over a weir. There are two main types of weir skimmer, those that require the weir height to be manually adjusted and those where the weir height is automatic or self-adjusting. Whilst manually adjusted weir skimmer types can have a lower initial cost, the requirement for regular manual adjustment makes self-adjusting weir types more popular in most applications. Weir skimmers will collect water if operating when oil is no longer present. To overcome this limitation most weir type skimmers contain an automatic water drain on the oil collection tank.

See also
 List of waste-water treatment technologies

References

Machines
Oil spill remediation technologies
Water pollution
Water technology